Marion is a census-designated place in Summit County, Utah, United States. The population was 685, according to the 2010 census.

Geography
Lying  due north of the city of Kamas on Utah State Route 32, Marion has always been closely associated with Kamas. Approximately  to the north, across the Weber River, is the city of Oakley.

History
The area that is now Marion was used in the 1860s by rancher Samuel P. Hoyt, whose 600–700 head of cattle grazed over most of Marion's land. The settlement itself was founded in the mid-1870s and was originally named "Morrell" after William Morrell, who built the first house. A large portion of the early settlers were Danish American immigrants, and the community was also often called "Denmark".

The name Marion has been credited to two different sources: Francis Marion Lyman, who, as President of the Quorum of the Twelve Apostles of the Church of Jesus Christ of Latter-day Saints, organized the first ward in the area in 1909, and Marion Myrick Sorensen, who settled here with her first husband in 1882. The Marion precinct first appeared under that name in the 1900 census.

Marion made news in 1979 when resident and polygamist homeschooler John Singer was killed while resisting arrest. The community garnered further publicity in 1988 when Singer's son-in-law, Addam Swapp, bombed the LDS stake center in Marion and was arrested after a 13-day standoff with state and federal law enforcement.

Demographics

As of the census of 2010, there were 685 people living in the CDP. There were 226 housing units. The racial makeup of the CDP was 96.4% White, 1.0% American Indian and Alaska Native, 1.8% from some other race, and 0.9% from two or more races. Hispanic or Latino of any race were 3.6% of the population.

Economy
The main economic activity in Marion has traditionally been farming. There are a few other businesses, including a small co-op store and a snowmobile dealership.

Education
Marion has no schools of its own.

Marion is in the South Summit School District. Schools in Kamas, belonging to the South Summit district, serve school-age children.

See also

 List of census-designated places in Utah

References

External links

Census-designated places in Utah
Populated places established in the 1870s
Census-designated places in Summit County, Utah
1870s establishments in Utah Territory